Allan Gonçalves Sousa (born 27 January 1997) is a Brazilian professional footballer who plays as a forward for Danish club Aalborg BK.

Club career

Early career 
In winter 2016, at the age of 19, Sousa joined Al Arabi club in the Stars League for half a season 2015–2016. The following season he was loaned to Al-Markhiya in the Second Division. Sousa left the team before 5 rounds than end, then moved to Denmark.

Vejle Boldklub
On 9 February 2017, Vejle Boldklub announced that Sousa had traveled with the team at training camp in Turkey prior to spring in the 2016–2017 season. The club also wrote that Sousa on the 12 day training camp would sign its agreement with the traditional club.

He established himself from the start of the spring season as a starter in the club, but scored first his first VB goal on May 7, when he delivered a direct free kick to VB at 1–1 home against AB.

In the following 2017–2018 season, he scored 9 goals in league and scored up to 8 VB scores in 28 matches. Thus he was a crucial player in Vejle Boldklub's return to Danish Superliga.

He started the 2018–19 season in Superliga by scoring Vejle Boldklub's first goal this season when he put VB ahead of 1–0 in what ended up being a 3–1 victory over Hobro IK. He also followed up in the subsequent two matches against Brøndby IF and AGF, respectively. Prior to the third match in the season against AGF, Sousa extended its contract with VB until summer 2021.

Loan to Sint-Truiden 
On 16 July 2019 it was confirmed, that Sousa had extended his contract with Vejle and would be loaned out to Belgian club Sint-Truidense.

Honours
Vejle
Danish 1st Division: 2017–18

References

External links

1997 births
Living people
Brazilian footballers
Association football forwards
Al-Arabi SC (Qatar) players
Al-Markhiya SC players
Vejle Boldklub players
Sint-Truidense V.V. players
AaB Fodbold players
Danish Superliga players
Danish 1st Division players
Qatar Stars League players
Qatari Second Division players
Belgian Pro League players
Place of birth missing (living people)
Brazilian expatriate footballers
Expatriate footballers in Qatar
Brazilian expatriate sportspeople in Qatar
Expatriate men's footballers in Denmark
Brazilian expatriate sportspeople in Denmark
Expatriate footballers in Belgium
Brazilian expatriate sportspeople in Belgium